Mark Sourian is an American film producer and studio executive.

Personal life

Sourian grew up in the Lenox Hill section of New York City, son of two college professors.  He graduated from Public School 6, Bronx High School of Science and, in 1995, magna cum laude, from Harvard College.  He married Stephanie Moy in September 2016.  They live in Los Angeles.

Career
Sourian has worked most of his career as a film studio production executive, most notably as Co-President of Production at DreamWorks beginning in 2009, where he oversaw production of The Ring and House of Sand and Fog, among others, and, in 2015, as Executive Vice-President at Universal, where he oversaw production on The Fate of the Furious. He quit DreamWorks in 2012 to start his own production company Mark Sourian Productions. As an independent producer, Sourian produced Need for Speed and executive produced Delivery Man, A Dog's Purpose and Ghost in the Shell.

References

Year of birth missing (living people)
Living people
American film producers
DreamWorks Pictures people
Harvard University alumni
The Bronx High School of Science alumni